Nopendi (born 15 November 1986) is a former Indonesian footballer.

International career 
Nopendi receives his first senior international cap against Philippines on 5 June 2012.

Indonesian's goal tally first.

Honours

Club honours
Persiba Bantul 
Liga Indonesia Premier Division (1): 2010-11

References

External links

1986 births
Living people
Javanese people
Indonesian footballers
Indonesia youth international footballers
Indonesia international footballers
Persiba Bantul players
Persepam Madura Utama players
Indonesian Premier League players
Liga 1 (Indonesia) players
Association football defenders
People from Bantul Regency
Sportspeople from Special Region of Yogyakarta